Castellana Sicula (Sicilian: Castiddana) is a comune (municipality) in the Metropolitan City of Palermo in the Italian region Sicily, located about  southeast of Palermo. 
 
Castellana Sicula borders the following municipalities: Petralia Sottana, Polizzi Generosa, Villalba.

References

External links
 Official website

Municipalities of the Metropolitan City of Palermo